Handballclub Fivers Margareten is a handball club from Wien, Austria. They currently compete in the Handball Liga Austria.

History

The handball club originates from Margareten, Wien's 5th district, hence the name Fivers. During its history, it reached the Austrian First Division for the first time in 1982, and since then it has been continuously in the national elite. They won the championship 3 times (2011, 2016, 2018), they were cup winners 8 times (1999, 2009, 2012, 2013, 2015, 2016, 2017, 2021) and they won the Super Cup 4 times (2013, 2014, 2015, 2020).

Crest, colours, supporters

Kit manufacturers

Kits

Sports Hall information

Name: – Sporthalle Margareten
City: – Wien
Capacity: – 1200
Address: – Hollgasse 3, 1050 Wien, Austria

Team

Current squad 

Squad for the 2022–23 season

Technical staff
 Head Coach:  Peter Eckl
 Assistant Coach:  Michael Gangel
 Goalkeeping Coach:  Sergiy Bilyk
 Coach:  Herbert Jonas
 Physiotherapist:  Birgit Gamper
 Masseur:  Monika Neckam

Transfers
Transfers for the 2022–23 season

Joining 

Leaving

Previous Squads

Titles

Austrian Championship
 Winner (3): 2011, 2016, 2018

Austrian Cup
 Winner (8): 1999, 2009, 2012, 2013, 2015, 2016, 2017, 2021

EHF Cup
 Semifinalist: 1985

EHF ranking

Former club members

Notable former players

  Martin Abadir (2001–2013)
  Thomas Bauer (2003–2009)
  Ivica Belas (2004–2008)
  Nikola Bilyk (2012–2016)
  David Brandfellner (2004–)
  Eric Damböck (2015–)
  Christoph Edelmüller (2008–2014)
  Wolfgang Filzwieser (2017–)
  Lukas Hutecek (2017–2021)
  Romas Kirveliavičius (2008–2014)
  Roland Knabl (1998–2005)
  Markus Kolar (1997–)
  Marin Martinović (2015–)
  Thomas Menzl (1989–1997)
  Nikola Stevanovic (2014–2021)
  Ibish Thaqi (2009–2011)
  Björn Tyrner (1996–2008)
  Tobias Wagner (2011–2016, 2018–2021)
  Richard Wöss (1994–2007, 2015–2016)
  Vytautas Žiūra (2003–2009, 2010–2020)
  Ivan Martinović (2015–2018)
  Kristian Pilipović (2009–2017)
  Adonis Gonzalez (2005–2016)
  Tomas Eitutis (2011–2016)
  Stefan Jovanovic (2016–2017)
  Doruk Pehlivan (2018–2019)
  Sergiy Bilyk (1999–2017)

Former coaches

References

External links
 
 

Austrian handball clubs